Joss Sheldon (born 7 April 1982, Barnet, UK) is an author who has released five novels; Individutopia (2018), Money Power Love (2017), The Little Voice (2016), Occupied (2015) and Involution & Evolution (2014). He released his first work of non-fiction, DEMOCRACY: A User's Guide, in 2020.

Early life 
Sheldon studied at the London School of Economics and the University of Liverpool. He worked for Burnley Football Club and Northampton Town Football Club, before becoming an author.

Involution & Evolution 
Involution & Evolution (2014) is an epic poem with an anti-war theme. The main protagonist, a conscientious objector during WW1, is based on Jesus and Buddha.

Occupied 
Occupied (2015) is a work of magical realism, inspired by the occupations of Palestine, Kurdistan and Tibet.

Sheldon told AXS that Occupied was based on the principle of divide and rule:I believe that deep down we’re all the same; we all share a common humanity; we all have hopes and dreams, strengths and weaknesses, fears and doubts. That’s a truly beautiful thing. But all too often we focus on the small differences which divide us. And that, for me, is a tragedy. It’s the greatest tragedy of all.Free Tibet named Occupied as one of three books to read in 2016. The Daily Herald called it a "A chilling critique of modern society". The Middle East Monitor said it had a "Simple, but strong political message".

The Little Voice 
The Little Voice (2016) is a work of psychological realism inspired by Sheldon's own life.

Steve Topple of The Canary called it "Top notch" and "Radical": "The Little Voice is radical, to say the least. But Sheldon’s style is warm, almost whimsical at times, and this means that even the most politically uninitiated reader will understand what he’s trying to say".

Money Power Love 
Money Power Love (2017) is a work of historical fiction which follows the lives of three men who are united by nature but divided by their different upbringings.

Individutopia 
Individutopia is a work of political dystopian fiction set in a time when corporations rule the roost. A small oligarch class own absolutely everything, inequality is extreme, and people have to pay to walk down the street or breathe the air.The Dallas Sun called it a "Modern classic", The Bay Net called it a "Must read", and The Canary called it "Gloriously colourful".

Other Work 
Sheldon has published a number of poems, which he has performed for Stop The Arms Fair.

Bibliography
Involution & Evolution. 2014. 
Occupied. 2015. 
The Little Voice. 2016. 
Money Power Love. 2017. 
Individutopia. 2018. 
DEMOCRACY: A User's Guide. 2020.

References

Interviews

 2019 Interview with Joss Sheldon at Cyberpunks.com

Living people
1982 births
British writers